Baby Yingliang (YLSNHM01266) is a remarkably intact dinosaur embryo discovered in Ganzhou, southern China. It is estimated to be 72 to 66 million years old. The embryo is considered to be a toothless theropod dinosaur, or oviraptorosaur. Researcher Dr. Fion Waisum Ma said, "It was the best dinosaur embryo found in history." The embryo appears to be an extremely early organism displaying an embryonic positioning similar to modern birds, but Baby Yingliang is the first example to be found in dinosaurs. In birds, the behavior known as "tucking" is controlled by the central nervous system and positions the head below the body, the feet on either side of the head and the back curled. The position aids in successful hatching.

References

Oviraptorosaurs
Dinosaur fossils